The white feather is a traditional symbol of cowardice in many places, although it may have the opposite meaning in others.

White feather or white feathers may also refer to:

Films
The White Feather, a lost 1913 short film featuring George Cooper
White Feather (film), a 1955 Western starring Robert Wagner
"The White Feather", an episode of the British television series Foyle's War
White Feather Films, a production company based in Mumbai, India, co-founded by Sanjay Dutt and Sanjay Gupta

Music
White Feathers, the debut album of British new wave band Kajagoogoo
"White Feather" (song), a song by Australian hard rock band Wolfmother
White Feather(song), a song by rock band Marillion, from the album Misplaced Childhood

Other uses
The White Feather (1907), a novel by P. G. Wodehouse
The Man Who Stayed at Home (play), a 1914 play that was renamed The White Feather when performed in North America
White Feather, the commercial version of the M25 sniper rifle, named after Carlos Hathcock (see below)

See also
Carlos Hathcock, US Marine sniper in the Vietnam War, nicknamed Lông Trắng du Kich (White Feather Sniper)